163 (one hundred [and] sixty-three) is the natural number following 162 and preceding 164.

In mathematics
163 is a strong prime in the sense that it is greater than the arithmetic mean of its two neighboring primes.

163 is a lucky prime and a fortunate number.

163 is a strictly non-palindromic number, since it is not palindromic in any base between base 2 and base 161.

Given 163, the Mertens function returns 0, it is the fourth prime with this property, the first three such primes are 2, 101 and 149.

As approximations, and 

163 is a permutable prime in base 12, which it is written as 117, the permutations of its digits are 171 and 711, the two numbers in base 12 are 229 and 1021 in base 10, both of which are prime.

163 is a Heegner number, the largest of the nine such numbers. The only other such integers are
. 

163 is the number of linearly -independent McKay-Thompson series for the monster group, which also represent their collective maximum dimensional representation. This fact about 163 might be a clue for understanding monstrous moonshine.

appears in the Ramanujan constant, since -163 is a quadratic nonresidue to modulo all the primes 3, 5, 7, ..., 37. In which  almost equals the integer 262537412640768744 = 6403203 + 744. Martin Gardner famously asserted that this identity was exact in a 1975 April Fools' hoax in Scientific American; in fact the value is 262537412640768743.99999999999925007259...

In other fields
163 is also:
 The number of days following the first day of Passover (Pesach), used to calculate the date of Rosh Hashanah,  the Jewish New Year.
 The Burj Khalifa in Dubai, United Arab Emirates, which is the tallest building in the world, has 163 floors.
 In darts, 163 is the lowest number that cannot be shot with three darts on a standard dart board.

See also
 163 (disambiguation)

References

 Wells, D. (1987). The Penguin Dictionary of Curious and Interesting Numbers (pp. 141–142). London: Penguin Group.

External links

 
 The Number 163
 The Positive Integer 163
 Prime curiosities: 163
 163.com website from NetEase
 The coolest number is 163
 163, the Monster and Number Theory
 VirtueScience: 163
 International Brotherhood of Electrical Workers Local Union 163
 US Highway 1633?], from Mathematics Stack Exchange

Integers